Keeley William Martin Todd is a New Zealand cricketer who plays for the Auckland Aces.

See also
 List of Auckland representative cricketers

1982 births
Living people
New Zealand cricketers
Auckland cricketers